"Social auditing" 

Social accounting and audit is a comprehensive triple bottom line planning and measurement method.

Social accounting and audit uses quantitative analysis of planned and actual measurement, ratio analysis for comparing trends over time, and qualitative analysis of constant comparison using ‘coding’ and ‘categorizing’ so that responses can be made and measured.

Social accounting and audit is an internal organizational system that is managed by the organization and moderated by an external independent evaluator.  The social accounting and auditing system includes the triple bottom line of:

 Commercial and financial – quantitative measurement is by regular data entry that is compared to quarterly and annual planned targets – a planned and actual method.  Financial ratios are used to compare trends over time within the organization and comparisons with sector standards.
 Social and community – measures internal and external none commercial planned objectives and operational methods through planned and actual accounting and through qualitative questions sets.
 Environmental and society – measure the commercial and none commercial performance of an organization's use of energy, waste and waste disposal, physical resources, and transport and communication methods.

Social accounting and audit achieves its form of measurement by using the actual values of the items and processes that are measured as the form of measurement; instead of converting social and environmental benefits and responsibility into financial values.

Financial audit provides information relevant for shareholders, while social accounting and audit provides information relevant for society.

History

During the 1970/80s co-operatives and social enterprise in the UK, Europe and USA started to use the term ‘Social Audit’ as a way of describing none financial measurement systems for commercial businesses.  Social Audit Ltd, in the UK, undertook environmental assessments of companies who it considered to be high polluters.  In Switzerland the co-operative supermarket chain Migros undertook special interest audits of specific issues it felt worthy of investigation and called these Social Audits.

In America, the consultancy firm, Abt Associates, conducted a series of social audits incorporated into its annual reports. The social concerns addressed included "productivity, contribution to knowledge, employment security, fairness of employment opportunities, health, education and self-development, physical security, transportation, recreation, and environment". The social audits expressed Abt Associate's performance in this areas in financial terms, and thus aspired to determine the company's net social impact in balance sheet form.

It wasn't until the late 1970s when Freer Spreckley developed an organizational Social Accounting and Audit system did Social Audit become an internal organizational system used by management of the organization to understand its commercial, social and environmental performance and influence.  The social accounting and auditing system also allowed for organizations to plan their social and environmental objectives with the same rigor they applied to planning their commercial objectives.

Current practices

Freer Spreckley introduced the first internal system for Social Accounting and Audit in his 1981 publication:

Social Audit Network (SAN) is perhaps the best known organization in the UK delivering regular training and support to social enterprises and community enterprises.

Corporate social responsibility
Types of accounting
Types of auditing